Surfing at the 2024 Summer Olympics is scheduled to take place from 27 to 30 July in Teahupo'o Beach, Tahiti, French Polynesia, breaking the record for the farthest medal competition to stage outside the host city. A total of 48 surfers (24 for each gender) will compete in the shortboard events, augmenting the athlete size by eight more than those in Tokyo 2020.

Venue
The surfing competition will stage in Teahupo'o, Tahiti, the French overseas territory of Polynesia in the southern Pacific. The decision was made to hold the surfing competition in the French territory instead of continental Europe because of the famous massive waves on the island suitable for the surfing competitions.

Qualification

The qualification system for Paris 2024 builds on the previous format used for Tokyo 2020, ensuring the participation of the world's best professional surfers, along with the vast promotion of geographical universal opportunities for surfers around the world at the Games. While the quota of two surfers per gender and country remains intact, two exceptions to this rule have been introduced for the ISA World Surfing Games 2022 and 2024 team champions which may result in some teams seeing their quota expand to three surfers.

Quota places will be distributed to the eligible surfers at the following events based on the hierarchical structure:
 Host country – As the host country, France reserves one quota place each for the men's and women's shortboard events. If one or more French surfers qualify regularly and directly, their slots will be reallocated to the next highest-ranked eligible surfers from the 2024 ISA World Surfing Games. 
 2022 ISA World Surfing Games –  The winning teams by gender will secure one place for their respective NOC, regardless of the two-per-country quota limit.
 2023 World Surf League Championship Tour – The top ten men and top eight women eligible for qualification will each be awarded a quota place. 
 2023 Pan American Games – The gold medalist of each shortboard event will be entitled to a spot for the Olympics; otherwise, it will be reallocated to the next highest-ranked surfer in the same tournament.
 2023 ISA World Surfing Games – The highest-ranked eligible male and female surfer from each continent (except the Americas) will be entitled to a spot for the Olympics; otherwise, it will be reallocated to the next highest-ranked surfer on the continent.
 2024 ISA World Surfing Games
 The winning teams by gender will secure one place for their respective NOC, regardless of the two-per-country quota limit.
 The top five men and top seven women eligible for qualification will each be awarded a quota place.
 Universality place – For the first time, an additional place per gender will be entitled to eligible NOCs interested to have their surfers compete in Paris 2024. To be registered for a spot granted by the Universality principle, the athlete must finish among the top 50 in his or her respective shortboard event at the 2023 or 2024 ISA World Surfing Games.

Competition schedule

Medal summary

Medal table

Events

References

 
2024
2024 Summer Olympics events
Olympics
Summer Olympics